State Highway 7 (SH 7) is an east–west state highway that runs from Interstate 35 at Eddy to U.S. Highway 84 about  west of the Texas-Louisiana state line. Between Crockett and Nacogdoches, SH 7 passes through the Davy Crockett National Forest. Commissioned on April 4, 1917, SH 7 is one of the original state highways established in Texas, and has been re-routed several times since its original conception. In earlier years, SH 7 mostly followed present day U.S. Highway 84, U.S. Highway 67, U.S. Highway 70 among other highways between northwest Texas and the Louisiana border. By 1939, most of the mileage belonging to SH 7 was transferred to the U.S. Highway System, leaving the highway extant only within eastern Texas. SH 7 subsequently went through several other major reroutings, truncations and extensions between 1939 and 1990, before becoming the highway it is today.

Route description
The highway travels through mostly flat, rural landscape, that lies between the Dallas-Fort Worth area and Houston. The highway also passes several small rivers, retaining dams and man made reservoirs, as well as cutting through the Davy Crockett National Forest and passing the northern boundary of the Sabine National Forest. SH 7 currently serves nine counties and nine incorporated towns and cities.

Bruceville-Eddy to Nacogdoches
SH 7 begins at an interchange with I-35 and FM 107 at Bruceville-Eddy in McLennan County. The highway proceeds due east crossing the Falls County line less than a mile east of the I-35 interchange. Just outside of Chilton, SH 7 meets US 77 and Business SH 7-B at an interchange. Where the highway continues straight ahead as the business route, SH 7 proper becomes concurrent with US 77, passing the eastern terminus of FM 1950, then splitting off on its own again, continuing east where US 77 continues south towards Victoria. SH 7 meets up with the eastern terminus of Bus. SH 7-B in Chilton as well as the southern terminus of FM 434. The highway heads east, passing the eastern terminus of FM 935 and SH 320 near Triangle, then crosses over the Brazos River on a bridge.

East of the river, SH 7 enters the town of Marlin, passing an intersection with Bus. SH 6-N at Williams Street and Craig Street. Further into town, SH 7 passes the southern terminus of FM 147 at Walker Street. On the east side of town, SH 7 intersects with SH 6 at a freeway grade interchange, then proceeds east out of Marlin. Heading away from Marlin, the highway has junctions with FM 2958, FM 3144, FM 1711/1771 and FM 2745 before crossing the Limestone County. SH 7 becomes Washington Street through Kosse, meeting at a junction with SH 14 at Mignonette Street. After crossing the railroad tracks and heading east of Kosse, SH 7 intersects with the southern terminus of FM 2749 at the Kosse Mine, then crosses the Robertson County line. The highway intersects with FM 979 and FM 937 before leaving Robertson county and entering Leon County. After entering Leon County, SH 7 intersects with US 79 and Loop 208 in Marquez, then continues east crossing a set of railroad tracks. After intersecting with FM 1147, the highway then crosses another set of railroad tracks in Concord. In Robbins, SH 7 intersects with FM 39. Entering Centerville, SH 7 becomes Saint Mary's Street and intersects with I-45 at exit 164. In the center of town, SH 7 has two junctions, with SH 75 at Commerce Street and the northern terminus of FM 1119 at Cass Street. SH 7 goes straight northeast out of Centerville, passing FM 811 and FM 1511, before curving east again and passing FM 542 and crossing over a creek into Houston County. Following a junction with FM 132, SH 7 arrives at a wye intersection with SH 21. Both SH 7 and SH 21 run concurrently east, crossing Loop 304 into Crockett.

Entering Crockett, SH 7/SH 21 become Goliad Avenue and intersect with the southern terminus of FM 229. The pair of highways then crosses under some railroad tracks at Commerce Street. Both highways arrive at the Crockett town square, which is comprised by four one-way streets centered around the Houston County Courthouse. The square also acts as a junction between US 287, SH 7, SH 21 and SH 19. SH 21 and SH 7 split away from each other at the square, with SH 21 heading northeast on Houston Avenue towards Alto, while SH 7 continues east on Goliad Avenue, intersecting a second time with Loop 304 before leaving town. After passing Houston County Airport, FM 232 and FM 1733, SH 7 enters Kennard, becoming Main Street. After passing a junction with FM 2781 at Welch Street, SH 7 arrives at a wye intersection, where it turns away from Main Street, heading northeast, while Main Street continues ahead as FM 357, before turning southeast towards Apple Springs. In Ratcliff, SH 7 turns to head east again at a junction with FM 227. East of Ratcliff, the highway briefly turns northeast again, crossing over the Neches River into Angelina County. Shortly after crossing the county line, SH 7 arrives at an intersection with the western terminus of SH 103. Where the roadway continues east as SH 103 to Lufkin, SH 7 turns briefly north, then heads diagonally northeast, passing FM 1819 near Redtown and a grade separated interchange with US 69 further northeast. SH 7 then crosses the Angelina River into Nacogdoches County

Nacogdoches to Joaquin
After passing a junction with FM 2782 in Harmony, SH 7 skirts the southern edge of A.L. Mangham Junior Regional Airport and enters Nacogdoches becoming Fredonia Street, before reaching a freeway interchange with US 59, SH 21 and Loop 224. Fredonia Street continues northeast into town as Bus. SH 7-N, where SH 7 joins US 59/SH 21/Loop 224 onto Stallings Drive, bypassing downtown Nacogdoches. At the interchange with South Street, which also serves as the southern terminus of Bus. US 59-F, US 59 splits off and continues south on South Street towards Victoria and Laredo. SH 7, SH 21 and Loop 224 continue east on Stallings Drive to an intersection with FM 224 at University Drive near the Cal-Tex Lumber facility. The four highways run concurrently for about two blocks, where FM 1275 splits off, heading south on Rayburn Drive. Shortly afterwards, SH 7/SH 21/Loop 224 meets with FM 2259 at a signalized intersection with Woden Road. East of FM 2259, SH 7/SH 21/Loop 224 curves northeast, to an interchange with East Main Street, which is the eastern terminus of Bus. SH 21-P. SH 21 leaves SH 7 and Loop 224 at this point, heading southeast on Main Street towards San Augustine. SH 7 and Loop 224 continue north to an intersection with Center Highway. While serving as the eastern terminus of Bus. SH 7-N, this intersection is also where SH 7 leaves Loop 224, heading in a northeasterly direction.

Leaving Nacogdoches, SH 7 passes junctions with FM 2112, FM 2713 in Swift and a short two block concurrency with FM 95 in Martinsville, then crosses the Attoyac River, briefly entering San Augustine County, then immediately enters Shelby County. Continuing northeast, the highway intersects with FM 2913 and FM 711, then passes a signalized intersection, acting as the western terminus of Loop 500, entering Center as San Augustine Street. In town, SH 7 has a junction with US 96 at Hurst Street, before reaching Center's town square, which is constructed around the Shelby County Courthouse. The town square also serves as a major intersection with SH 87 and the southern terminus of FM 699. Heading northeast from the town Square on Cora Street and Louisiana Street, SH 7 crosses under a set of railroad tracks, passing intersections with FM 2788 at Sardis Road and Loop 500, before leaving town. On the edge of town, SH 7 passes the southern terminus of FM 1656 at Center Municipal Airport. SH 7 passes intersections with FM 2608 in James and FM 3082, arriving on the outskirts of Joaquin. After passing an intersection with FM 139 and Cunnings Street, SH 7 ends at an intersection with US 84 at a Picnic Area outside town. The highway continues northeast as US 84 across the Sabine River into Logansport, Louisiana.

History
SH 7 was one of the original 25 state highways proposed on June 21, 1917, proposed as a 'Central Texas Highway.' In 1919, the routing was mostly proposed between San Angelo and Goldthwaite, but only the segment to Paint Rock was created. From Goldthwaite, the road follows U.S. Highway 84 to Waco.  The remainder follows SH 164 to Personville, FM 39 to Jewett, was unbuilt between Jewett and Crockett, SH 7 then SH 103 to Lufkin, and finally onto the state line via present-day U.S. Highway 69, SH 63, and US 190. On November 20, 1917, SH 7 was rerouted along current U.S. Highway 67 to Brownwood, and U.S. Highway 84 to Waco.

Possibly due to the amount of construction necessary to build this route as proposed, on December 18, 1917, the road was rerouted via U.S. Highway 84 to Palestine, and south on U.S. Highway 287 to Crockett, following the proposed route from there. On March 20, 1918, the road was completely rerouted via current U.S. Highway 84 through Lubbock to Sweetwater.  Between Sweetwater and Coleman, the road was not constructed as proposed.  SH 7 returns to US 84, through Waco to Palestine, heads south on U.S. Highway 287 to Crockett, turns to Lufkin via the current SH 7, then SH 103 and finally onto Jasper and Newton via present-day U.S. Highway 69, SH 63, and US 190. The old route of SH 7 from Brownwood to San Angelo was renumbered as SH 7A.

On August 21, 1923, SH 7 had been realigned yet again, mainly due to constructions issues.  The Sweetwater-Coleman road was never built, and SH 7 was rerouted over existing roads into Abilene. The road's east terminus was shortened to Long Lake. The Crockett-Lufkin section was cancelled, and the section east of Zavalla had been renumbered as SH 63.
In 1926, U.S. Highway 70 (US 70), US 80, and US 67 were overlaid over pieces of SH 7, which maintained its number. On October 26, 1932, the highway was extended east across SH 294 into Alto, SH 21 to Nacogdoches, ending in Joaquin via current SH 7, replacing SH 76. On May 23, 1933, SH 7 Loop was designated through Post. On November 27, 1934, SH 7 Spur was designated to Southland. On July 15, 1935, the section of SH 7 from Elkhart to Alto was cancelled. On February 21, 1937, this section was restored. On February 21, 1938, SH 7 Business was designated in Goldthwaite.

On May 24, 1938, a spur to Oglesby was created, but not designated. On December 21, 1938, SH 7 Spur was designated in Oglesby. On September 26, 1939, most of the highway had been overrun by a patchwork of U.S. Highways, leaving only a small portion from Joaquin to Crockett remaining, rerouted yet again to a more southerly route from Nacogdoches, replacing SH 266 and part of SH 103. SH 7 Loop and SH 7 Spur became Spur 18 (Oglesby), Spur 45 (Southland), and Loop 46 (Post). On April 1, 1940, SH 7 was extended west to Centerville. On November 22, 1940, the section from Ratcliff to Crockett was cancelled. On December 3, 1940, SH 7 was extended west to Marquez. On February 20, 1942, the section from Ratcliff to Crockett was redesignated as part of SH 7. SH 7 replaced SH 139 from Chilton to Marquez (originally ended in Marlin; extended east on September 7, 1943) on July 15, 1948. SH 7 was signed (but not designated) to extend west to Eddy on July 31, 1975. The extension to Eddy was officially designated on August 29, 1990, replacing a portion of FM 107. At the request of the City of Nacogdoches, both SH 7 and SH 21 were re-routed onto Loop 224 and part of US 59 around the south side of town on October 25, 2018.

 SH 7A was a spur route of SH 7 that split off at Brownwood and traveled southwest to San Angelo designated on March 20, 1918, replacing part of SH 7, which was rerouted. On December 20, 1917, an intercounty highway was designated from San Angelo to Fort Stockton. On February 19, 1919, it extended to Fort Stockton over this intercounty highway. It was transferred to portions of SH 23 and SH 30 (now US 277) on August 21, 1923, with the section from San Angelo to Fort Stockton cancelled.

 SH 7B was a spur route of SH 7 designated on January 23, 1922, that split off at Lufkin and traveled southwest through Groveton to Trinity. On August 21, 1923, it was cancelled.

Major intersections

Business routes
SH 7 has two business routes.

Chilton business route

Business State Highway 7-B (Bus. The route was created in 1990 from a section of FM 107. Bus. SH 7-B begins at an interchange with US 77. The highway continues west of the intersection as a segment of SH 7. Where SH 7 heads south, concurrent with US 77, Bus. SH 7-B heads east, before curving south at an intersection with Mooreville Road. Shortly after the southeasterly turn, Bus. SH 7-B passes the eastern terminus of County Road 4023 (CR 4023), followed by the western terminus of CR 4019. CR 4019 provides access to the center of Chilton. Bus. SH 7-B however, skirts the edge of town and does not serve the town center. From the intersection with CR 4019, Bus. SH 7-B continues south to its terminus with mainline SH 7. Although this intersection marks the end of the business route, the highway continues south as CR 494N to a dead end at the northern bank of Deer Creek.

This business route was previously designated as a section of FM 107, which used to continue east from I-35 in Bruceville-Eddy to SH 7 right outside of Chilton. Between August 29, 1990, and October 25, 1990, the eastern end of FM 107 was truncated to I-35 and the eastern section transferred to SH 7 and the newly designated Bus. SH 7-B.

Major intersections

Nacogdoches business route

Business State Highway 7-N (Bus. The route was created on October 25, 2018, after SH 7 was re-routed around Nacogdoches on Loop 224 and US 59. Bus. SH 7-B begins at an interchange with SH 7 and US 59/SH 21/Loop 224. The business route then travels northeast on Fredonia Street for one mile (1.61 kilometers), then reaches an intersection with Bus. US 59-F at South Street. Bus. SH 7-B and Bus. US 59-F head north on South Street into downtown Nacogdoches, meeting at an intersection with Bus. SH 21-P at Main Street. Bus. SH 7-N turns right, leaving Bus. US 59-F, then heading east concurrently with Bus. SH 21-P on Main Street. Both business routes pass intersections with FM 1275 at University Drive and FM 2259 at Shawnee Street. At Orton Hill, Bus. SH 21-P breaks away from Bus. 7-N, heading east. Bus. SH 7-N continues northeast for a few more miles on Center Highway, before ending at a traffic controlled intersection with Loop 224 and SH 7.

Major intersections

References

External links

 

007
Transportation in Shelby County, Texas
Transportation in San Augustine County, Texas
Transportation in Nacogdoches County, Texas
Transportation in Angelina County, Texas
Transportation in Houston County, Texas
Transportation in Leon County, Texas
Transportation in Robertson County, Texas
Transportation in Limestone County, Texas
Transportation in Falls County, Texas
Transportation in McLennan County, Texas